Form I-129, Petition for a Nonimmigrant Worker is a form submitted to the United States Citizenship and Immigration Services used by employers or prospective employers to obtain (or amend the details of) a worker on a nonimmigrant visa status. Form I-129 is used to either file for a new status or a change of status, such as new, continuing or changed employer or title; or an amendment to the original application. Approval of the form makes the worker eligible to start or continue working at the job (on or after the indicated start date) if already in the United States. If the worker is not already in the United States, an approved Form I-129 may be used to submit a visa application associated with that status. The form is 36 pages long (8 pages for the main form, and the remaining pages for various supplements not all of which may be applicable to every petition) and the instructions for the form are 29 pages long. It is one of the many USCIS immigration forms.

Visa statuses for which the form is required or may be used

Visa statuses that require the form for initial employment as well as extension or change of status
For the following statuses, a Form I-129 must always be filed for initial employment as well as for extension of status or change to employment details:

Visa statuses that require the form only for change of status

For visa statuses associated with free trade agreements, a Form I-129 is needed only if the worker is transitioning status while within the United States. Workers who are outside the United States can directly apply for a visa based on their job offer and other supporting documents. The statuses include:

Relation with visa process

For the visa classifications that require Form I-129, a person outside the United States needs to apply for the corresponding visa. The visa application must include an approved Form I-129 as well as other supporting documents necessary for the visa status.

For each of the classifications for which Form I-129 can be filed, there are associated visa classes for dependents (spouses and minor children), such as the H-4 visa for H visa holders and the O-3 visa for O visa holders. Those already present in the United States who want to transition to dependent status can file Form I-539 for change of status.

Whether an individual holds a single-entry or multiple-entry visa, the applicant may need to apply for visas multiple times if traveling outside the United States repeatedly. Each of these visa applications will rely on the same approved Form I-129 that is used as the basis for the worker's current work authorization; those who have already started employment may also need to submit additional proof showing that they have been working for the employer their status is associated with since the start date.

Relation with other forms
 Form I-140 is a similar form filed by an employer or prospective employer for a worker for an employment-based visa (EB-1 visa, EB-2 visa or EB-3 visa). These employment-based visas are immigrant visas, and lead to Green Cards. The key difference between Forms I-140 and I-129 is that they are for immigrant and non-immigrant visas respectively.
 Form I-765 is the application form for non-immigrant workers to receive an Employment Authorization Document (EAD). Unlike the forms above, it is not a petition but an application made directly by the person seeking the EAD. Form I-765 cannot be used to immigrate to the United States or change one's non-immigrant status but rather is used by those in the United States on various statuses (such as students on F visas or eligible DACA applicants) to be able to work. The EAD classification is not tied to any particular employer and gives the worker the flexibility to choose any employer, possibly subject to constraints about the nature of work or the number of hours worked. For instance, F visa holding students receive an EAD for post-completion Optional Practical Training. The key difference between Forms I-129 and I-765 is that the former is filed by the employer and is associated with a specific job whereas the latter is filed by the employee and is not tied to a particular job.

Form I-129 is unrelated to Form I-129F, a form used by the fiancé(e)s of citizens and permanent residents to acquire fiancé(e) non-immigrant status, usually with the intention to file for Adjustment of Status after arriving in the United States.

References

United States Department of Homeland Security
United States government forms